Jean-Christophe Potton (Lyon, 13 December 1960) is a French diplomat.

He studied at the Institut d’Études Politiques de Paris (diploma in 1981), Panthéon-Assas University (Master in Political Science, 1983) and the Ecole Nationale d’Administration (graduated June 1987).

Since November 2009 he is the French ambassador in Montevideo.

References

1960 births
Living people
Diplomats from Lyon
Sciences Po alumni
Paris 2 Panthéon-Assas University alumni
École nationale d'administration alumni
Ambassadors of France to Uruguay